Top Spin 4 is a tennis video game developed by 2K Czech and published by 2K Sports released on the PlayStation 3, Wii, and Xbox 360 consoles. It was the last game to be released for the franchise. The game features licensed professional players, venues and equipment. The game was released on March 15, 2011 in America, and was released on March 18 in the PAL region. The PS3 version supports the PlayStation Move and is also compatible in 3D. The Xbox 360 version does not support the Kinect but is 3D compatible.

Player Roster 

Men:
Andre Agassi, Andy Murray, Andy Roddick, Bernard Tomic, Bjorn Borg, Boris Becker, Gilles Simon, Ivan Lendl, James Blake, Jim Courier, Michael Chang, Nikolay Davydenko, Novak Djokovic, Patrick Rafter, Pete Sampras, Rafael Nadal, Roger Federer, Stanislas Wawrinka

Women:
Ana Ivanovic, Caroline Wozniacki, Dinara Safina, Eugenie Bouchard, Jelena Jankovic, Serena Williams, Vera Zvonareva

Reception 

The PlayStation 3 and Xbox 360 versions received "favorable" reviews, while the Wii version received "mixed" reviews, according to the review aggregation website Metacritic. GameZone said of the PS3 version: "Top Spin 4 offers tennis lovers plenty all on its own, and it presents itself in beautiful form. Its great depth of gameplay, packaged in an approachable and fun format, elevates it to the upper echelon of tennis titles. Buy the game, not the 3D spectacle". In Japan, Famitsu gave them each a score of one eight, two sevens, and one six for a total of 28 out of 40.

The game also gained an Award in a Booom Competition for being the best Czech video game of the year.

Influence 
The game inspired the development of a spiritual successor titled Tennis World Tour which was released in 2018.

References

External links 
 
 

2011 video games
2K Czech games
2K Sports games
Cancelled Windows games
PlayStation 3 games
PlayStation Move-compatible games
Sports video games set in the United States
Take-Two Interactive games
Tennis video games
Video games developed in the Czech Republic
Video games set in Australia
Video games set in Austria
Video games set in Bermuda
Video games set in Canada
Video games set in Chile
Video games set in China
Video games set in Croatia
Video games set in Dubai
Video games set in Germany
Video games set in Hong Kong
Video games set in India
Video games set in Ireland
Video games set in London
Video games set in Monaco
Video games set in Morocco
Video games set in New York City
Video games set in New Zealand
Video games set in Paris
Video games set in Rome
Video games set in Russia
Video games set in San Francisco
Video games set in Senegal
Video games set in Shanghai
Video games set in South Korea
Video games set in Spain
Video games set in the Netherlands
Video games set in Ukraine
Wii games
Xbox 360 games
Cultural depictions of Andre Agassi
Cultural depictions of Jelena Janković